The SC-76 Thunderbolt is a bolt-action sniper rifle manufactured by British company Steel Core Designs. It feeds from a detachable box magazine which holds 10 rounds of either .308 Winchester, or more commonly, 7.62x51mm NATO. It costs between $2500 and $3000 per unit and is sold on both the civilian and military markets. Simon Schofield, head of the Security and Defence Division of the Humanitarian Intervention Centre, has described the rifle as "a serious bit of counterterrorism gear and built to be a bit civilian friendly”. The rifle was considered for use by the Indian MARCOS special forces unit, but ultimately rejected in favour of the Tikka T3 (designated the T3 TAC) by Beretta.

Features 
The SC-76 is designed primarily for police and military use, and to maximise accuracy, reliability under adverse conditions, as well as user ergonomics, it has various added features, such as:
 600mm Picatinny rail
 Match grade barrel, fitted with a muzzle brake
 Fully adjustable bipod and monopod
 Polymer stock
 High tensile steel receiver
 Two-stage trigger

See also
List of sniper rifles
Cyclone Rifle

References

7.62×51mm NATO rifles
Bolt-action rifles of the United Kingdom
Sniper rifles of the United Kingdom